Lahoud (Arabic: لحود) or LaHood is the surname of a Maronite Lebanese family whose members have been prominent in Lebanese politics.

A part of the Daou families, they allegedly trace their origin back to Ghassanids.

Politicians

 Émile Lahoud (b. 1936), president of Lebanon from 1998 to 2007
 :nl:Jamil Lahoud (1901–1983), general in the Lebanese Army and former minister and MP, father of president Emile Lahoud
 Emile Lahoud Jr. (b. 1975), Lebanese politician, son of president Emile Lahoud
 , (1912–1987), Lebanese Army officer and MP of Metn district between 1972 until his death, brother of Salim Lahoud
 Salim Lahoud (1910–1971), former Minister and MP of Metn District, brother of Fouad Lahoud
 Nassib Lahoud (1944–2012), Lebanese politician, son of Salim

Other

 Michael Lahoud (b. 1986), Sierra Leonian footballer
  (b. 1967), brother of Marwan Lahoud
 Joe Lahoud (b. 1947), American baseball player
 Marwan Lahoud (b. 1966), French engineer born in Lebanon
 Romeo Lahoud (b. 1931), Lebanese director of musicals 
 Aline Lahoud (b. 1986), Lebanese singer

See also

 Nehme, another Lebanese family who shares the same Daou ancestry

References

Ghassanids

fr:Lahoud